Tomislav Paškvalin (born 29 August 1961) is a retired Croatian water polo player. He is a double Olympic gold medal winner with Yugoslavia at the 1984 and 1988 Summer Olympics.

As of 2014, Paškvalin is a member of the Croatian Olympic Committee's Supervisory Board.

His son, Fran, was also an international water polo player.

See also
 Yugoslavia men's Olympic water polo team records and statistics
 List of Olympic champions in men's water polo
 List of Olympic medalists in water polo (men)
 List of world champions in men's water polo
 List of World Aquatics Championships medalists in water polo

References
  Tomislav Paškvalin 
 COC Supervisory Board

External links
 

1961 births
Living people
Croatian male water polo players
Yugoslav male water polo players
Croatian sports executives and administrators
Olympic water polo players of Yugoslavia
Olympic gold medalists for Yugoslavia
Sportspeople from Zagreb
Water polo players at the 1984 Summer Olympics
Water polo players at the 1988 Summer Olympics
Olympic medalists in water polo
Medalists at the 1988 Summer Olympics
Medalists at the 1984 Summer Olympics
World Aquatics Championships medalists in water polo
Mediterranean Games gold medalists for Yugoslavia
Competitors at the 1983 Mediterranean Games
Mediterranean Games medalists in water polo
20th-century Croatian people